Iraq was one of the first Arab nations to embrace the Scouting movement, launching its program in 1921, just two years after the League of Nations had created the country out of the old Ottoman Empire. Iraq was a member of the World Organization of the Scout Movement from 1922 to 1940, and again from 1956 to 1999 before being reintroduced as a member again in 2017.

History
Prior to and during World War II, RAF Habbaniya maintained a Scout group for British and local boys.

In 1990, during the period when the Iraq Boy Scouts and Girl Guides Council was recognized by World Order of the Scouting Movement (WOSM), the Mesopotamian nation had 12,000 Scouts, however by 1999, Iraq had been expelled from the WOSM.

Rebirth
In late 2004, Chip Beck, a former Navy commander had the idea to try and restart Scouting in Iraq after serving there. The Iraqi Scouts Initiative committee was led by Co-Chairmen Beck and Michael Bradle, an Eagle Scout.

In early 2008, a group of coalition military officers led by Navy chaplain Lieutenant Commander Andrew Wade sought to expand the Green Zone Council's model to the Iraqis living in and around the Victory Base Complex around Baghdad International Airport.  Meeting with the Green Zone Council and their Iraqi counterparts, and spending several months building relationships with Iraqi civilian and military leaders on and around Victory Base, the group founded the Victory Base Council in April 2008 and began supporting troop meetings in June 2008.  Following the "Green Zone" model, the VBC is a loosely organized fraternal support group that enables their Iraqi partners to establish and grow a vibrant Scouting organization to serve local Iraqi youth. During 2008 the VBC built important relationships with local schools and worked with local Iraqi military and civilians to create a camp and community center where the troop meetings are held.  Continued growth of the camp facilities, and ongoing cross training of US and Iraqi Scout leaders are underway for 2009.
 

Since the movement restarted in 2004, it has been taken over by Iraqis and is now run exclusively by them. Iraqi Scouts are involved in community service such as helping police with traffic control, giving first aid, cultivating cotton, planting trees and helping during natural disasters.

In February 2006, 18 Iraqi Guides attended a leadership seminar in Egypt organized by the World Association of Girl Guides and Girl Scouts. The association is currently listed as "working toward membership". In 2010  was founded the Turkmen Federation of Scouts (Türkmen Izcilik Federasyonu) based in Kirkuk.

The Scout Motto is Kun Musta'idan or كن مستعداً, translating as "Be Prepared" in Arabic. The noun for a single Scout is Kashaf or كشاف in Arabic.

Emblems

References

External links 
 News article
 Iraqi Provisional Government article
 Green Zone Council
https://www.youtube.com/watch?v=zJg-1ttaDnA Iraqi Boy Scouts and Girl Guides
https://www.youtube.com/watch?v=aqL4rTMHL9A Boy/Girl Scouts of Iraq
http://blog.girlscouts.org/2011/01/girl-and-boy-scouts-of-iraq.html

Society of Iraq
World Organization of the Scout Movement member organizations
Scouting and Guiding in Iraq
Youth organizations established in 1921
1921 establishments in Iraq